This is the list of Punjabi films released in Indian Punjab ordered by year and decade.

 List of Indian Punjabi films after 2011
 List of Indian Punjabi films between 2001 and 2010
 List of Indian Punjabi films between 1991 and 2000
 List of Indian Punjabi films between 1981 and 1990
 List of Indian Punjabi films between 1971 and 1980
 List of Indian Punjabi films before 1970

See also
 List of Pakistani Punjabi-language films

Punjabi cinema
Punjabi